Anders Morgenthaler (born 5 December 1972) is a Danish comics artist, children's book author, animator and film director.

Biography
Morgenthaler is a graduate of Designskolen Kolding and the National Film School of Denmark. Having worked as a TV host on the Danish TV channel DR's children's show KatjaKaj og BenteBent, and directed several music videos, he eventually directed the feature film Princess in 2006, earning him a Nordisk Film Award.

Prior to this, comic strip Wulffmorgenthaler produced in collaboration with comedian Mikael Wulff, brought attention and success in 2001. A comic strip competition entry named Kalzone, completed few hours before the entry deadline, submitted under the pseudonym Pernille Richter Andersson, led to victory in the competition, and a one-month run in the national newspaper Politiken. The strip became a regular feature on DR's internet culture portal in 2002, and in October 2003 it became a daily newspaper strip in Politiken. Due to the unusually uninhibited and adult nature of the strip, this led to disgruntled reader reactions and cancelled subscriptions for Politiken, but the strip remained. It later became syndicated to Swedish tabloid newspaper Aftonbladet in 2006. English versions of the strip also feature as a popular webcomic, and TV shows centered on the recurring character Dolph, a blue fascist hippopotamus, has been produced in various incarnations on DR.

Bibliography
 Wulffmorgenthaler (with Mikael Wulff)
1. Se, uden hænder! (Look, No Hands!) (2003, Politikens forlagshus)
2. Ups... (Whoops...) (2004, Politikens forlagshus)
3. Underholdning for hele familien! (Fun for the Whole Family!) (2005, Politikens forlagshus)
4. Smukke oplevelser i naturen (The Beauty of Nature) (2006, Politikens forlagshus)
Morgenthalers Dyrefabler (Morgenthaler's Animal Fables)
Baobabtræet (2005, Politikens forlagshus)
Bjarnes tænder (2005, Politikens forlagshus)

Filmography
Araki: The Killing of a Japanese Photographer (2003, short film)
Raunchy - Watch Out (2004, music video)
Princess (2006)
Echo (2007)
The Apple and the Worm (Æblet og Ormen, 2009)
The ABCs of Death - K is for Klutz (2013, short film)
I Am Here (2014)
Mugge and the Street Party (2019)

Awards
2006: The Nordisk Film Award

Sources

 Anders Morgenthaler publications at Politikens forlagshus 

Footnotes

External links
Wulffmorgenthaler.com Official webcomic site in English
Wulffmorgenthaler and Wulffmorgenthaler satire TV archives on DR 
Dolph unofficial site 

Danish animated film directors
Danish children's writers
Danish film directors
Danish comics artists
Danish animators
Living people
1972 births